Voivodeship road 430 (abbreviated DW 430) is a route in the Polish voivodeship roads network. It runs through the Greater Poland Voivodeship (Poznań County), leading from Poznań, through Luboń and Puszczykowo to Mosina where it meets Voivodeship road 431.

Major cities and towns along the route 
 Poznań (motorway A2, national road 5, national road 11, voivodeship road 196, Voivodeship road 433)
 Luboń
 Puszczykowo
 Mosina (Voivodeship road 431)

Route plan 

430